100 Years: Celebrating a Century of Recording Excellence is a religious compilation album released by the Mormon Tabernacle Choir marking the centennial of the choir's earliest recordings.  The choir's first recording was on September 1, 1910.

The album reached No. 154 on the Billboard 200 on July 3, 2010.  It also reached No. 6 on the Christian chart and remained on the chart for 17 weeks, No. 21 on the Independent Albums chart, and No. 1 on the Classical Albums chart, remaining on the chart for 48 weeks.

Track listing

Charts

Year-end charts

References

2010 compilation albums
Tabernacle Choir compilation albums
Centennial anniversaries